Pseudocomotis nortena is a species of moth of the family Tortricidae. It is found in Costa Rica.

The length of the forewings is about 18 mm for males and 19–24 mm for females. There are fine, transverse gold striae bordered by small white dots on the forewings.

Etymology
The specific name refers to the relatively northern distribution of the species.

References

Moths described in 1998
Chlidanotini